Suck On is a compilation album by The Pastels, released in 1988. It consists of a number of singles and B-sides released by the band between 1983 and 1985, as well as three tracks from a BBC session recorded in 1984. Tracks 4, 6 and 7 come from this session. Like Sittin' Pretty, the album is currently out of print.

Track listing 
"Baby Honey"
"I Wonder Why"
"Something Going On"
"Million Tears"
"Surprise Me"
"She Always Cries on Sunday"
"Baby Honey"
"I'm Alright With You" 
"Couldn't Care Less"
"What's It Worth"

Personnel
 Stephen McRobbie (aka Stephen Pastel) – lead vocals, guitar
 Brian Taylor (aka Brian Superstar) – guitar
 Martin Hayward – bass, vocals
 Annabel Wright – vocals, organ, artwork
 Bernice Simpson – drums
 Sandy Forbes – drums on "Something Going On"
 Jill Bryson - backing vocals on "I Wonder Why"
 Rose McDowall - backing vocals on "I Wonder Why"

Notes 

 Tracks 1, 4 and 5 originally released on the 1984 single Million Tears
 Track 2 originally released as a single in 1983
 Track 3 originally released as a single in 1984
 Tracks 8, 9 and 10 originally released on the 1985 single I'm Alright With You
 Tracks 4, 6 and 7 recorded for a David Jensen BBC session on 1 July 1984, previously unreleased

The BBC session tracks were not originally broadcast. One song from the session; "Twenty Five Unfinished Plays", an early version of their 1986 single "Truck Train Tractor", has never been released but is available online.

The original version of "Million Tears" from the single is not included but is available on several Various Artists compilations. 

The Pastels albums
1988 compilation albums